Lamb Dome Dome is a granite dome, in the Tuolumne Meadows area of Yosemite National Park. It is one of the smaller domes.

Lamb Dome and Drug Dome are two of the more obscure domes in Tuolumne Meadows, despite their being close to the road. They are just west of the popular Daff Dome and Fairview Domes. Lamb and Drug Dome are side by side.

On Lamb Dome Dome's particulars

Both Lamb and Drug Domes offer about a half dozen rock climbing routes. Most of the climbing on Lamb Dome is on its northwest face.

References

External links and references

 Hiking trails, near Lamb Dome

Granite domes of Yosemite National Park